is Ali Project's second studio album, released on December 9, 1992.

Track listing

References

Ali Project albums